Ali Ahmed Al-Amri (born 28 December 1987) is a Saudi Arabian long-distance runner who specializes in the 3000 metres steeplechase.

He was born in Ta’if.

Career
He finished tenth at the 2006 World Junior Championships, and fourth at the 2006 Asian Games. He also competed at the 2007 World Championships, the 2011 World Championships, the 2008 Summer Olympics and the 2012 Summer Olympics without reaching the final.

His personal best time is 8:21.87 minutes, achieved in June 2006 in Algiers. He also has 8:14.86 minutes in the 3000 metres, achieved in August 2004 in Rabat; 13:56.80 minutes in the 5000 metres, achieved in May 2006 in Qatif; and 30:25.03 minutes in the 10,000 metres, achieved in July 2006 in Macau.

References

1987 births
Living people
Saudi Arabian male long-distance runners
Athletes (track and field) at the 2008 Summer Olympics
Athletes (track and field) at the 2012 Summer Olympics
Olympic athletes of Saudi Arabia
Asian Games medalists in athletics (track and field)
Athletes (track and field) at the 2006 Asian Games
Athletes (track and field) at the 2010 Asian Games
Athletes (track and field) at the 2014 Asian Games
Athletes (track and field) at the 2018 Asian Games
People from Taif
Saudi Arabian male steeplechase runners
Asian Games bronze medalists for Saudi Arabia
Medalists at the 2010 Asian Games
21st-century Saudi Arabian people